Homalarthria is a genus of flies in the family Stratiomyidae.

Species
Homalarthria nigra Lindner, 1933

References

Stratiomyidae
Brachycera genera
Taxa named by Erwin Lindner
Diptera of South America